Round Oak is an unincorporated community in Jones County, Georgia, United States.

History
The community was named for a nearby large oak tree, which stood as a landmark to local Indians. A post office called Round Oak was established in 1878, and remained in operation until 1906.

The Georgia General Assembly incorporated Round Oak as a town in 1914. The town's municipal charter was repealed in 1995.

Father and son Alonzo and James D. Green were innocent African-Americans lynched near Round Oak and Wayside, Jones County, Georgia in retaliation for the murder of popular white farmer Silas Hardin Turner on July 4, 1915. A third man, William Bostick was also lynched on this day. None of those killed received a trial.

References

 

Former municipalities in Georgia (U.S. state)
Unincorporated communities in Jones County, Georgia
Unincorporated communities in Georgia (U.S. state)
Populated places disestablished in 1995